Lubbockvirus is a genus of viruses in the family Myoviridae, not assigned to a subfamily. Bacteria serve as the natural host, with transmission achieved through passive diffusion. There are  two species in this genus.

Taxonomy
The following two species are assigned to the genus:
 Clostridioides virus phiCDHM19
 Clostridium virus phiCD119

Structure
Lubbockviruses are nonenveloped, with a head and tail. The head has a diameter of about 50  nm. The tail is around 110 nm long, and is flexible and contractile.

Genome
Some species have been fully sequenced and are available from ICTV. They range between 50k and 57k nucleotides, with 75 to 82 proteins. The complete genomes are available here.

Life cycle
The virus attaches to the host cell using its terminal fibers, and ejects the viral DNA into the host cytoplasm via contraction of its tail sheath. Once the viral genes have been replicated, the procapsid is assembled and packed. The tail is then assembled and the mature virions are released via lysis.

History
According to the ICTV's 2010–11 report, the genus PhiCD119likevirus was first accepted as a new genus, at the same time as all three of its contained species. This proposal is currently unavailable, as the link seems to be broken. The following year (2012), the name was changed to Phicd119likevirus. This proposal is available here. The genus was later renamed to Lubbockvirus.

References

Myoviridae
Virus genera